The Final Year is a 2017 American documentary film directed by Greg Barker. The film is a chronicle of the Barack Obama administration's foreign policy team and the events of Obama's final year in office. While President Obama features at certain points, the documentary crew mainly followed the activities of Secretary of State John Kerry, UN Ambassador Samantha Power, National Security Advisor Susan Rice and Deputy National Security Advisor Ben Rhodes. Although the documentary does not feature Donald Trump, the emphasis among the main players switches as the final year progresses from enacting a foreign policy legacy to taking measures to protect that legacy from being dismantled by the incoming administration.

External links
 
 

2017 films
2017 documentary films
American documentary films
Documentary films about American politics
Presidency of Barack Obama
Films directed by Greg Barker
Films about Barack Obama
Foreign policy of the Barack Obama administration
John Kerry
HBO documentary films
2010s English-language films
2010s American films